The Fairmile C motor gun boat was a type of motor gunboat designed by Norman Hart of Fairmile Marine for the Royal Navy. An intermediate design, twenty-four boats were built in 1941 receiving the designations MGB 312–335.

Design
The Fairmile type C was a reuse of the hull form of the type A but with the lessons learned from the type A incorporated in terms of steering and deck layout.

Service
Five boats of the twenty-four built were lost to enemy action.

The class was mainly involved in close escort work with east coast convoys, and some boats were engaged in clandestine operations. MGB 314 took part in Operation Chariot, the daring raid on the St Nazaire docks (the only facility on the axis-held Atlantic coast suitable to refit s).

Only two survive to this day, one at Hayling Island and the other in Bembridge Harbour, Isle of Wight, although now sunk and due to be broken up 2018. A third survived in Shoreham until 2002.

See also
 Fairmile A motor launch
 Fairmile B motor launch
 Fairmile D motor torpedo boat
 Fairmile H landing craft
 Steam Gun Boat
 Coastal Forces of the Royal Navy

Notes

References
John Lambert and Al Ross, Allied Coastal Forces of World War Two, Volume I : Fairmile designs and US Submarine Chasers 1990, Conway Maritime Press

External links

 
 National Historic Ships
 Raid on St. Nazaire

 

Military boats
Gunboat classes
Gunboats of the Royal Navy
Ship classes of the Royal Navy